Stéphanie Balique-Gibaud  is a public relations and an event marketing specialist.

Working for UBS France in Paris, she has in particular played a decisive role in blowing the whistle on the practices of tax evasion and laundering of tax fraud in organized group of UBS AG (Switzerland) with the complicity of UBS France.

Biography 
After studying languages in Lille, France, she worked for TransManche Link (TML,  the Channel Tunnel), the embassy of the United States of America, the RC Lens football club and UBS wealth management in Paris.

She joined UBS in 1999 where her mission was to develop partnerships with luxury brands and organise client events in France. She has played a key role in blowing the whistle and making public the fact that UBS AG has encouraged tax evasion and money laundering practices with the complicity of UBS France.

She has been acting as a whistleblower since 2008 working with French authorities and namely with the French customs.
She has also been listened by the Belgian authorities (UBS Belgium being under investigation).

She published a book where she explained the practices of UBS (translation into English available in Sept. 2015).

She received the Anticor ethics prize in January 2015 before being invited to testify by the "Tax Ruling" commission of the European Parliament in Brussels.

In June 2015, she was officially invited to an audition at the embassy of Argentina in Paris by Ricardo Echegaray,  minister of finance of Argentina and the members of the Argentinian "commission bicamerale" who are working on the mechanism of tax evasion.

Stephanie Gibaud has publicly asked Argentina to bring to the G20 the question of the protection of citizens who put themselves at risk for standing up in the public interest.

On Septembre 10, 2015, Stéphanie Gibaud  was nominated for the Sakharov Prize 2015, together with two other whistleblowers, Edward Snowden and Antoine Deltour.

The UBS case 

During 8 years with UBS France, her job was to develop partnerships with luxury houses and to organize events for wealth clients of the bank on the French territory.

In 2007, the American banker Bradley Birkenfeld story gets out. His disclosures to the United States government led to a massive fraud investigation against the Swiss bank UBS and other banks that had enabled tax evasion by U.S.taxpayers.
 
All the internal procedures of the bank are thus modified everywhere in the world where UBS has offices.

In June 2008, Stephanie Gibaud was requested by her manager to delete the content of her hard drive because the office of the Paris general director was searched.

These files contained the names and coordinates of clients and prospects of the bank as well as the names of their respective client advisors in France, Switzerland, Luxembourg, Belgium, Monaco etc.

Stephanie Gibaud refused to comply with the instruction, her manager repeated her request and will also ask her to toss the content of her paper archives. A tug-of-war then started and Stephanie Gibaud complained of harassment, exclusion and discrimination.

Several executives of the bank confirmed to her that sales service proposed by Swiss client advisors is illegal in France. They further explained that UBS France has implemented a parallel accounting named "milk notebook" that gathers on a monthly basis the tax evasion transactions of French clients to offshore locations.

UBS France tried to dismiss her in 2009 but the dismissal was refused. In 2010, UBS France filled in a complaint against her for defamation but lost their trial. She was finally made redundant in 2012.

As a whistleblower by the French labor inspection as of 2008 and by the public prosecutor when filling a complaint against her employer at the end of 2009, Stephanie Gibaud has been listened to by the brigade of repression of the crime against the people (BRPD, part of the French financial brigade) in February 2011 and in March 2015 and several times by the customs, judicial investigations in 2011 and 2012.

She was also listened to by Belgian investigators as part of the indictment of UBS Belgium in July 2014 and several times in 2015.

In 2012, Stephanie Gibaud was listened to by Eric Bocquet, senator and reporter of the tax evasion commission and then by Yann Galut, deputy, in July 2013. Her name appears in the reports of the senate commission of inquiry dated July 17, 2012. and October 17, 2013

In February 2014, she published "La Femme qui en savait vraiment trop" (the woman who knew too much) at the Cherche Midi publisher. She explains various dysfunctions of the bank, namely about the illegal sales service of the Swiss client advisors on the French territory and tax evasion.

Antoine Peillon, investigation journalist, who signed the postface of her book clearly explained that Stephanie Gibaud has been one of the sources of her book entitled "Ces 600 milliards qui manquent à la France" (these 600 billions which lack in France), published in March 2013.

On march 5, 2015, the labor court ruled in favor of Stephanie Gibaud and condemned UBS to pay a fine of €30,000 for harassment. The bank did not appeal the case.

In May 2015, Stephanie Gibaud and her publisher received a complaint from UBS France for defamation.

On May 11, 2015 she was being listened to by the tax ruling committee in the European Parliament in Brussels, invited by Alain Lamassoure. Eva Joly, European deputy, who was seating in the commission, evoked her support to Stephanie Gibaud in an interview given to France Inter (radio) on January 24, 2015.

In June 2015, Stephanie Gibaud co-wrote a tribune in L'Express magazine with Nicolas Dupont-Aignan to defend the cause of the whistleblowers.

On June 17, 2015, Stephanie Gibaud was officially received by Ricardo Etchegaray (AFIP) at the embassy of Argentina in Paris. She was listened to by the members of the bicameral commission of the Argentinian congress. who investigate tax evasion. She then asked Argentina to bring the question of the protection of the ones who put themselves in danger to protect the common good to the G20

Publication 
La femme qui en savait vraiment trop, Paris, publisher Le Cherche Midi, published in 2014.

References

External links 
 
 www.afip.gob.ar

Notes and references 

French whistleblowers
Living people
Public relations people
1965 births